Venezuela competed at the 2012 Summer Olympics in London, from July 27 to August 12, 2012. This was the nation's seventeenth consecutive appearance at the Olympics, since its debut at the same host city in 1948. Celebrating the anniversary of the nation's Olympic debut, the British Embassy in Caracas invited former track cyclist Julio César León to travel back to the United Kingdom, and revisit his memories as the first Venezuelan athlete in history to compete at the games.

With the absence of baseball and softball at the Olympics, the Venezuelan Olympic Committee (COV) sent the nation's second-largest delegation to the Games. A total of 69 athletes, 43 men and 29 women, competed in 15 sports. There was only a single competitor in artistic gymnastics, shooting, and table tennis. Among the sports, Venezuela marked its Olympic debut in beach volleyball.

Notable Venezuelan athletes included sisters Andreína and Yanel Pinto in freestyle and open water swimming, all-around gymnast Jessica López, and track cyclist Daniela Larreal, who made her Olympic comeback in London after an eight-year absence. Table tennis player Fabiola Ramos, who competed at her fifth Olympics, was the most experienced athlete and became Venezuela's second consecutive flag bearer at the opening ceremony, and the fourth in Olympic history.

Venezuela left London with its first gold medal since 1968, and its second in Olympic history. It was awarded to fencer Rubén Limardo, who won the men's individual épée.

Medalists

| width="78%" align="left" valign="top" |

| width="22%" align="left" valign="top" |

Competitors

Archery

Venezuela qualified two archers.

Athletics

Venezuelan athletes have so far achieved qualifying standards in the following athletics events (up to a maximum of 3 athletes in each event at the 'A' Standard, and 1 at the 'B' Standard)):

Men
Track and road events

Women
Track and road events

Field events

Boxing

Venezuela has qualified boxers for the following events

Men

Women

Cycling

Venezuela has qualified in the following events

Road

Track
Sprint

Team sprint

Keirin

Omnium

BMX

Diving

Venezuela has qualified in the following events.

Men

Women

Fencing

Venezuela qualified 6 fencers.

Men

Women

Gymnastics

Artistic
Women

Judo

Venezuela has qualified 3 judokas

Sailing

Venezuela has qualified 2 boat for each of the following events

Men

M = Medal race; EL  = Eliminated – did not advance into the medal race;

Shooting

Women

Swimming

Venezuelan swimmers have so far achieved qualifying standards in the following events (up to a maximum of 2 swimmers in each event at the Olympic Qualifying Time (OQT), and potentially 1 at the Olympic Selection Time (OST)

Men

Women

Table tennis 

Venezuela qualified one athlete.

Volleyball

Beach

Weightlifting

Venezuela has qualified 1 man and 2 women.

Wrestling

Venezuela has qualified in the following events

Men's freestyle

Men's Greco-Roman

Women's freestyle

References

Nations at the 2012 Summer Olympics
2012
2012 in Venezuelan sport